The Bethesda Trolley Trail, at one time known as the North Bethesda Trail, is a  long rail trail from Bouic Avenue next to the Twinbrook Metro Station in the city of Rockville to Battery Lane Park in Bethesda, Maryland.

History and description 
The trail runs primarily on the abandoned right-of-way of the Tennallytown (Tenleytown) and Rockville Railroad, also known as the Washington and Rockville trolley.  Where the trail is not on the right-of-way, it runs on-road, on sidewalks or on side paths.

Planning for a trail on the old streetcar right-of-way began in the 1970s. The right-of-way was used by streetcars from 1890 to 1935, when it converted to buses. Some of the right of way then sat fallow for decades. Building a trail on the unused part of the right-of-way was first suggested in Montgomery County's 1978 Countywide Bikeways Master Plan, but design of the trail didn't begin until the early 1990s. Construction was held up for many years due to opposition from neighbors and funding issues, but funding for the bridges over I-495 and I-270 was approved in 1999.

Construction of the trail began in fall of 2000 and lasted nearly a decade. Money to reconstruct existing sections of the trail was diverted to the Forest Glen Metro overpass project, delaying work on the trail and it was further delayed by the bridge fabrication. Bridges over I-495 and I-270 opened in 2002 and 2003 respectively, adding to narrow, discontinuous sections that existed prior to 2002 between Nicholson Lane and Beech Avenue. Paving and building the trail from the intersection of Cedar Lane to the intersection of Randolph Road with Rockville Pike began in November 2005, and continued into 2006. Between Charles Street and Cedar Lane and north of Nicholson Lane, the trail was on sidewalks. Around the same time, the National Institutes of Health (NIH) built a trail along the south edge of their facility connecting Rugby Avenue to the sidewalk along Old Georgetown Road. In 2008, the new sections of the trail, including the sidewalks, were signed. As part of the Montrose Parkway West project in 2009, a section of trail — a side path along Rockville Pike — was constructed from Per Sei Place to Hubbard Drive, north of the White Flint Metro Station. That section connected to a path built along Montrose Parkway at the same time.

References

External links
 The Bethesda Trolley Trail - Video by MCDOT

Bethesda, Maryland
Rail trails in Maryland
Protected areas of Montgomery County, Maryland
Transportation in Montgomery County, Maryland